Presidente Néstor Kirchner Regional Airport  is an airport serving the city of Villa María in the Córdoba Province of Argentina.

Runway length includes a  displaced threshold on Runway 02.

See also

Transport in Argentina
List of airports in Argentina

References

External links
OpenStreetMap - Kirchner Regional Airport
OurAirports - Kirchner Regional Airport

Airports in Argentina